In six-dimensional geometry, a cantellated 5-cube is a convex uniform 5-polytope, being a cantellation of the regular 5-cube.

There are 6 unique cantellation for the 5-cube, including truncations. Half of them are more easily constructed from the dual 5-orthoplex

Cantellated 5-cube

Alternate names 
 Small rhombated penteract (Acronym: sirn) (Jonathan Bowers)

Coordinates 
The Cartesian coordinates of the vertices of a cantellated 5-cube having edge length 2 are all permutations of:

Images

Bicantellated 5-cube 

In five-dimensional geometry, a bicantellated 5-cube is a uniform 5-polytope.

Alternate names 
 Bicantellated penteract, bicantellated 5-orthoplex, or bicantellated pentacross
 Small birhombated penteractitriacontiditeron (Acronym: sibrant) (Jonathan Bowers)

Coordinates 
The Cartesian coordinates of the vertices of a bicantellated 5-cube having edge length 2 are all permutations of:
(0,1,1,2,2)

Images

Cantitruncated 5-cube

Alternate names 
 Tricantitruncated 5-orthoplex / tricantitruncated pentacross
 Great rhombated penteract  (girn) (Jonathan Bowers)

Coordinates 

The Cartesian coordinates of the vertices of an cantitruncated 5-cube having an edge length of 2 are given by all permutations of coordinates and sign of:

Images

Related polytopes 
It is third in a series of cantitruncated hypercubes:

Bicantitruncated 5-cube

Alternate names
 Bicantitruncated penteract
 Bicantitruncated pentacross
 Great birhombated penteractitriacontiditeron (Acronym: gibrant) (Jonathan Bowers)

Coordinates 
Cartesian coordinates for the vertices of a bicantitruncated 5-cube, centered at the origin, are all sign and coordinate permutations of
 (±3,±3,±2,±1,0)

Images

Related polytopes 

These polytopes are from a set of 31 uniform 5-polytopes generated from the regular 5-cube or 5-orthoplex.

References 
 H.S.M. Coxeter: 
 H.S.M. Coxeter, Regular Polytopes, 3rd Edition, Dover New York, 1973 
 Kaleidoscopes: Selected Writings of H.S.M. Coxeter, editied by F. Arthur Sherk, Peter McMullen, Anthony C. Thompson, Asia Ivic Weiss, Wiley-Interscience Publication, 1995,  
 (Paper 22) H.S.M. Coxeter, Regular and Semi Regular Polytopes I, [Math. Zeit. 46 (1940) 380-407, MR 2,10]
 (Paper 23) H.S.M. Coxeter, Regular and Semi-Regular Polytopes II, [Math. Zeit. 188 (1985) 559-591]
 (Paper 24) H.S.M. Coxeter, Regular and Semi-Regular Polytopes III, [Math. Zeit. 200 (1988) 3-45]
 Norman Johnson Uniform Polytopes, Manuscript (1991)
 N.W. Johnson: The Theory of Uniform Polytopes and Honeycombs, Ph.D. 
  o3o3x3o4x - sirn, o3x3o3x4o - sibrant, o3o3x3x4x - girn, o3x3x3x4o - gibrant

External links 
 
 Polytopes of Various Dimensions, Jonathan Bowers
 Runcinated uniform polytera (spid), Jonathan Bowers
 Multi-dimensional Glossary

5-polytopes